Major General William James Macavoy Locke, MC (14 August 1894 – 3 April 1962) was a senior officer in the Australian Army during the Second World War and the immediate post-war period.

A graduate of the Royal Military College, Duntroon, Locke served in the First World War and spent much of the interwar period as a staff officer in Melbourne, Sydney and Tasmania. During the Second World War he commanded cavalry and armoured units at the brigade and division level, and was responsible for supervising the transition of many of Australia's mounted units to motorised and armoured formations. Locke finished his military career as Chairman of the Permanent Post-War Planning Committee (1944–1946).

References

1894 births
1962 deaths
People from St Kilda, Victoria
Australian generals
Australian military personnel of World War I
Australian Army personnel of World War II
Australian recipients of the Military Cross
Graduates of the Staff College, Camberley
Military personnel from Melbourne
Royal Military College, Duntroon graduates